Professor Johannes Theodorus Claassen (23 September 1929 – 6 January 2019) was a South African rugby player, playing at the second-row forward position.

Biography 
He attended school in Christiana and later attended University in Potchefstroom. He made his first appearance for Western Transvaal when he was 19 years old and went on to play a total of 105 matches for Western Transvaal. He made his Test debut six years later against the Lions at Ellis Park.

In 1958, Claassen became captain of the South African National Team before a match against the French. In 1962, he led the South African team to a winning streak, including a major victory over the British and Irish Lions. From 1968 to 1971 he was head coach of the South African team, known as the Springboks, winning 17 out of 26 test matches.

In club rugby, Claassen was most notably a star for Western Transvaal.

After retiring from rugby he went on to become a teacher, before becoming a lecturer at Potchefstroom University and later a Professor of Bible Studies.

References

1929 births
2019 deaths
South African rugby union players
South African rugby union coaches
Rugby union locks
People from Prince Albert Local Municipality
South Africa international rugby union players
South Africa national rugby union team captains
Leopards (rugby union) players